Lovund Church is a chapel of the Church of Norway in Lurøy Municipality in Nordland county, Norway. It is located in the island village of Lovund. It is an annex chapel in the Lurøy parish which is part of the Nord-Helgeland prosti (deanery) in the Diocese of Sør-Hålogaland. The white, wooden chapel was built in a long church style in 1960 using plans drawn up by the architects John Egil Tverdahl, Petter Andersen, and Harald Myrvang. The building was consecrated on 11 September 1960 by the Bishop Hans Edvard Wisløff.

See also
List of churches in Sør-Hålogaland

References

Lurøy
Churches in Nordland
Wooden churches in Norway
20th-century Church of Norway church buildings
Churches completed in 1960
1960 establishments in Norway
Long churches in Norway